Tang Caichang (1867 – 22 August 1900) was a late Qing dynasty revolutionary and political activist. He and fellow reformer Tan Sitong were from Liuyang. Tang was chosen by Kang Youwei to lead an uprising in Hankou, however he and thirty others were arrested by Qing forces before it ever began on August 21, 1900. By order of Zhang Zhidong, then Viceroy of Huguang, he was beheaded the following day in Wuchang. He is considered by the Chinese to be a martyr for revolution.

See also
Tan Sitong
Kang Youwei
Sun Yat-sen
Hundred Days' Reform
Wuchang uprising

1900 deaths
1867 births
Executed Qing dynasty people
People executed by the Qing dynasty by decapitation
19th-century executions by China
Writers from Changsha
Executed people from Hunan
Qing dynasty essayists
Chinese revolutionaries
Wuhan